Nasser Mirghavami was an Iranian weightlifter. He competed in the men's middleweight event at the 1948 Summer Olympics.

References

Year of birth missing
Year of death missing
Iranian male weightlifters
Olympic weightlifters of Iran
Weightlifters at the 1948 Summer Olympics
Place of birth missing